Micropentila dorothea, the Dorothea's dots, is a butterfly in the family Lycaenidae. It is found in Sierra Leone, Liberia, Ivory Coast, Ghana, Nigeria (south and the Cross River loop), Cameroon, Gabon and the western part of the Democratic Republic of the Congo. The habitat consists of primary forests.

References

Butterflies described in 1903
Poritiinae
Butterflies of Africa
Taxa named by George Thomas Bethune-Baker